The family of the two Swiss chroniclers called Diebold Schilling was originally from Solothurn. Klewi Schilling was a somewhat dubious character, and he was banned from the city, settling in Hagenau (Alsace), and probably died in Kaysersberg. 

His eldest son Hans worked as a scribe in the publishing house of Diebold Lauber in Hagenau. Klewi's younger son, Diebold Schilling the Elder worked in Lucerne as a chancellor. 

In 1460, Diebold moved to Bern for a post as a scribe to the city council, and Hans moved to Lucerne to take over the post vacated by his brother. Hans took after his father and went adventuring, visiting the court of Matthias Corvinus in Vienna together with the chronicler Melchior Russ in 1488 from where they both returned destitute. 

Hans' son, Diebold Schilling the Younger, was also something of a bohemian, and spent at least two years imprisoned for misdemeanour and for providing refuge for criminals.

See also 
 Swiss illustrated chronicles.

Swiss families